Codeine Velvet Club is the debut, and only, studio album by Codeine Velvet Club. It was released on 28 December 2009 by Island Records in the United Kingdom and was released on 6 April 2010 by Dangerbird Records in the United States.

Background and release

The album was produced by Jon Lawler and Stuart McCredie and mixed by Tony Hoffer (Who produced The Fratellis' debut album Costello Music) and was recorded at Terminal Music in Glasgow, Playground Studios in Glasgow and Angel Recording Studios in London. The album was written by Jon Lawler (with some tracks written by Lou Hickey and Will Foster).

The album was originally meant to be released on 23 November, but was pushed back as the band were a little unhappy with aspects of the album and wanted to change them. However, on the Vic Galloway show, Lawler stated that it was silly to release the album before the tour, meaning changes might not have been made. The album was accidentally released for Digital Download on 16 November from Amazon, HMV and Play.com, but was later removed.

Composition
In the track by track, Lawler reveals information about each tack. "I Would Send You Roses" was originally written for a collaboration between The Fratellis and Roger Daltrey, but the collaboration never went ahead and so it was used for this. "Begging Bowl Blues" features no vocals from Lou Hickey as the song didn't suit her voice. Lawler was also keen to point out the variety of instruments used and how each song has a unique sound.

Track listing

Personnel 

Codeine Velvet Club
 Jon Lawler – Guitar, Bass, Vocals
 Lou Hickey – Vocals

Featuring
 Ross McFarlane - Drums (Tracks 1, 6-11)
 Affy Ahmad - Drums (Tracks 2, 4 and 5)
 Helen MacLeod - Harp (Tracks 2, 3, 6 and 7)
 The Gospel Truth Choir (Tracks 3 and 4)
 Ed McFarlane - Double Bass (Track 4)
 Mick Cooke - Trumpet (Track 4)
 Allan Cuthbertson - Piano (Track 8)
 Will Foster - Keys (Track 11)
 Lewis Gordon - Bass (Track 11)

Additional Personnel
 Rick Wentworth - Conductor
 Perry Montague-Mason - String Leader
 Derek Watkins - Solo Trumpet
 Mark Nightingale - Solo Trombone
 Mick Cooke - Orchestral Arrangements

Production
 Jon Lawler and Stuart McCredie - Producer
 Tony Hoffer - Mixing
 Stuart McCredie - Engineer, assisted by Niall McMenamin
 Ian Cooper - Mastering
 Recorded at Terminal Music, Glasgow; Playground Studios, Glasgow; Angel Recording Studios, London
 Isobel Griffiths - Musicians' Contractor
 Lucy Whalley - Assistant Musicians' Contractor

Publishing
 Published by EMI Music Publishing
 Mike Dewdney @ ITB - Booking Agent
 John Squire and Ian Brown - Writers of "I Am the Resurrection"
 M. Grant @ Infinite Thrill - Design, Logo and Photography
 Jay Brooks - Band Portrait

Members downloads 
In a similar fashion to the Fratellis' Budhill Singles Club, Codeine Velvet Club are releasing free song downloads on their website for members of the site. The downloads are untitled, unlike the Budhill Singles Club. Listed below are the tracks that have been released on this section.

 "Nevada" (Acoustic Version) - 3:34
 "Little Sister" (Live Studio Version) - 2:28
 "Mellotron Boogie No 3" (Instrumental) - 2:39
 "I Am the Resurrection" (Cover Version) - 4:52

Release history

References

External links
Codeine Velvet Club - Dangerbird Records
Codeine Velvet Club on Rdio
Codeine Velvet Club on Spotify
Codeine Velvet Club on SoundCloud
Codeine Velvet Club - "Hollywood" - Music Video - YouTube
Codeine Velvet Club - "Vanity Kills" - Music Video - YouTube
Codeine Velvet Club - "Little Sister" - Live in Studio - YouTube
Codeine Velvet Club - "Nevada" - Live Groupee Session - YouTube

2009 debut albums
Codeine Velvet Club albums